The 1952 Wimbledon Championships took place on the outdoor grass courts at the All England Lawn Tennis and Croquet Club in Wimbledon, London, United Kingdom. The tournament was held from Monday 23 June until Saturday 5 July 1952. It was the 66th staging of the Wimbledon Championships, and the third Grand Slam tennis event of 1952. Frank Sedgman and Maureen Connolly won the singles titles.

This was the first Wimbledon tournament during the reign of Queen Elizabeth II.

Finals

Seniors

Men's singles

 Frank Sedgman defeated  Jaroslav Drobný, 4–6, 6–2, 6–3, 6–2

Women's singles

 Maureen Connolly defeated  Louise Brough, 7–5, 6–3

Men's doubles

 Ken McGregor /  Frank Sedgman defeated  Vic Seixas /  Eric Sturgess, 6–3, 7–5, 6–4

Women's doubles

 Shirley Fry /  Doris Hart defeated  Louise Brough /  Maureen Connolly, 8–6, 6–3

Mixed doubles

 Frank Sedgman /  Doris Hart defeated  Enrique Morea /  Thelma Long, 4–6, 6–3, 6–4

Juniors

Boys' singles

 Bobby Wilson defeated  Trevor Fancutt, 6–3, 6–3

Girls' singles

 Fenny ten Bosch defeated  Rita Davar, 5–7, 6–1, 7–5

References

External links
 Official Wimbledon Championships website

 
Wimbledon Championships
Wimbledon Championships
Wimbledon Championships
Wimbledon Championships